The Heidelberg Center for Latin America is a postgraduate institute in Santiago de Chile affiliated with Heidelberg University. It was founded in 2001 and officially opened on 9 April 2002. It is the only European-affiliated university in Chile.

References

External links

Heidelberg University
2002 establishments in Chile
Educational institutions established in 2002